Todd Gollihare is an American politician who is the Oklahoma Senate member from the 12th district since 2022.

Early life and education
Todd Gollihare grew up in Stratford, Oklahoma and graduated from Stratford High School. He graduated college with a Bachelor of Science degree in Business Administration in 1986 from East Cetntral University in Ada, Oklahoma. While serving in the Marine Corps, he earned his Juris Doctor from the University of Tulsa College of Law.

Military career
Gollihare joined the United States Marine Corps in 1986 and served for 25 years, retiring as a lieutenant colonel.

Political and government career
Gollihare served on the Kellyville Board of Education from 2004 to 2016 even serving through a deployment to Iraq. After retiring from the U.S. Courts, he taught a leadership class for a year at Kellyville High School before being elected into the Oklahoma Senate. He worked as the Chief Probation Officer for the Northern District of Oklahoma from 2014 to 2020 and spent the entirety of his career working for the U.S. Courts.

Oklahoma Senate
In 2022, only two Republican candidates filed for the open seat in Oklahoma's 12th senate district: Todd Gollihare and Rob Ford. Incumbent Senator James Leewright decided to retire before being term limited. " Gollihare defeated Rob Ford in the June Republican primary, winning the senate seat since no other party's candidate filed. He was sworn in on November 16, 2022.

Personal life
Gollihare married the love of his life, Melanie Gollihare, in 1987 and they had three daughters, Brette, Bailey and Brenna. In 2020, he lost his wife of 32 years to cancer. He lives in Kellyville, Oklahoma.

References

21st-century American politicians
Living people
Republican Party Oklahoma state senators
Year of birth missing (living people)
People from Garvin County, Oklahoma
University of Tulsa College of Law alumni
United States Marine Corps officers